Alen Sherri (born 15 December 1997 in Shkodër) is an Albanian professional footballer who plays as a goalkeeper for Albanian club Egnatia in the Albanian Superliga and the Albania national football team.

Club career

Early career
Sherri started his youth career at KF Vllaznia Shkodër academy in 2012. In the 2013–14 season he won the U-17 Championship with Vllaznia Shkodër U-17.

Vllaznia Shkodër
He made his professional debut on 12 April 2015 against Tirana playing the full 90-minutes match where Tirana won 2–1 by overturning the score with a twice by Gentian Muça in the 61st and 76th minutes, following a Red card to Vllaznia's defender Elvin Beqiri in the 57th minute.

During the 2014–15 season Sherri became the second choice behind Erind Selimaj and ahead of Italian guardian Gianmarco Campironi during the first half and Zamir Vjerdha during the second-half. He featured in 17 league matches playing 7 full 90-minutes matches. In the 2015–16 season he became third choice following arrival of Montenegros Andrija Dragojević. He featured in 32 games playing 3.

In October 2015 he had a trial at Italian giants A.S. Roma.

Loan at Savona
Following arrival of Montenegrin goalkeeper Jasmin Agović in August 2016, coach of Vllaznia Shkodër Armando Cungu decided to send Sherri on a loan at Serie D relegated side Savona F.B.C.

Laçi
On 9 August 2020, Sherri signed with KF Laçi as a free agent.

International career
Sherri received his first call up to the Albania under-21 national team by the head coach Skënder Gega on 8 June 2015 for the Friendly matches against Kazakhstan & Sweden on 12 & 16 June 2015. He was called up for the second time at Albania U21 by a new appointed coach Redi Jupi to participate in the Antalya Cup developed in Antalya, Turkey against Saudi Arabia U23 on 22 January 2016, Bahrain U23 on 24 January, Azerbaijan U21 on 26 January, Kosovo U21 on 28 January and Ukraine U21 on 30 January.

Sherri was called by coach Redi Jupi to participate with Albania U21 in the 2017 UEFA European Under-21 Championship qualification Group 4 matches against Greece U21 and Hungary U21 on 24 & 28 March 2016 respectively.

Sherri was called up to the Albania national team by head coach Edy Reja on 26 May 2021 for the June friendlies.

Career statistics

Club

References

External links

1997 births
Living people
Footballers from Shkodër
Albanian footballers
Albania youth international footballers
Albania under-21 international footballers
Association football goalkeepers
KF Vllaznia Shkodër players
Kategoria Superiore players
Kategoria e Tretë players
Kategoria e Dytë players
Kategoria e Parë players
Albanian expatriate footballers
Albanian expatriate sportspeople in Italy
Expatriate footballers in Italy